The Parliamentary Under-Secretary of State for Children, Families and Wellbeing, formerly the Minister of State for Schools and Childhood is a junior ministerial position in the Department for Education, previously the Department for Children, Schools and Families and Department for Education and Skills, in the Government of the United Kingdom. 

The post was previously known as the Parliamentary Under-Secretary of State for Children and Families until the appointment of the incumbent Minister of State Kelly Tolhurst on 7 September 2022, who succeeded Brendan Clarke-Smith.

History
Margaret Hodge was the first person to hold the position after it was announced in 2003. Maria Eagle was the Minister from 2005 to 2006 taking Hodge's place, and Beverley Hughes held the position from 2006 until June 2009, when Dawn Primarolo took over until Labour lost office in May 2010.

List of Ministers
Colour key (for political parties):

References

Ministers for children, young people and families
Ministerial offices in the United Kingdom
2003 establishments in the United Kingdom
Department for Education
Education ministers of the United Kingdom